William Arnold Peters (May 14, 1922 – September 17, 1996) was a Canadian politician. He represented the riding of Timiskaming in the House of Commons of Canada from 1957 to 1980. He was originally elected as a member of the Co-operative Commonwealth Federation, which became the New Democratic Party in 1961.

Peters, a hard rock miner and union organizer, served in the 124th Ferry Squadron in the Royal Canadian Air Force during World War II. He also ran in the 1953 election against Karl Eyre in the Timmins riding, but was not elected.

In Parliament, Peters and his caucus colleague Frank Howard were responsible for reforming Canada's divorce laws. In many provinces, divorce proceedings once had to be presented to Parliament for approval; Peters and Howard tried to show the ridiculousness of this by reading each divorce petition into the Commons record in great detail. Peters was also active in prison reform, and regularly lobbied for fairer treatment of non-unionized government employees. He also prepared a private member's bill in 1964 to decriminalize homosexuality in Canada, although the bill never made it to a vote in the House of Commons.

In the 1980 election, Peters was defeated by Liberal candidate Bruce Lonsdale. Lonsdale died in office just two years later; Peters ran again in the resulting by-election, but was not re-elected.

On September 19, 1996, two days after his death, tributes to Peters were delivered in the House of Commons by Bill Blaikie, Diane Marleau and Ed Harper.

Electoral record

|-

|Liberal
|Karl EYRE
|align="right"|5,541 

|Co-operative Commonwealth
|Arnold PETERS
|align="right"| 4,686 

|Progressive Conservative
|Maurice BÉLANGER
|align="right"| 3,348 

|}

|-

|Co-operative Commonwealth
|Arnold PETERS
|align="right"|6,936   

|Liberal
|Ann SHIPLEY 
|align="right"|6,896 

|Progressive Conservative
|C. Foster RICE
|align="right"|5,645   

|-

|Co-operative Commonwealth
|Arnold PETERS
|align="right"|7,544   

|Progressive Conservative
|C. Foster RICE
|align="right"|7,318    

|Liberal
|Ted J. MIRON
|align="right"|6,118    

|-

|New Democratic Party
|Arnold PETERS
|align="right"|7,055   

|Progressive Conservative
|Joseph MAVRINAC
|align="right"|6,053   

|Liberal
|Ann SHIPLEY
|align="right"|5,969 

|-

|New Democratic Party
|Arnold PETERS
|align="right"|7,356   

|Liberal
|Mervyn LAVIGNE
|align="right"|6,763 

|Progressive Conservative
|John CRAM
|align="right"| 5,540 

|-

|New Democratic Party
|Arnold PETERS  
|align="right"| 9,986  

|Liberal
|Mervyn LAVIGNE
|align="right"| 5,885 

|Progressive Conservative
|Bruce BESLEY
|align="right"|3,823 

|-

|New Democratic Party
|Arnold PETERS
|align="right"| 8,482 

|Liberal
|Louis-R. VANNIER
|align="right"| 7,728 

|Progressive Conservative
|George L. CASSIDY
|align="right"|4,443 

|-

|New Democratic Party
|Arnold PETERS
|align="right"|11,327   

|Liberal
|Dick DUFF
|align="right"|7,768 

|Progressive Conservative
|Alf GUPPY
|align="right"|3,317 

|-

|New Democratic Party
|Arnold PETERS
|align="right"|10,263  

|Liberal
|Guy IANNUCCI
|align="right"|6,598 

|Progressive Conservative
|Murray WATTS
|align="right"| 4,615

|-

|Liberal
|Bruce LONSDALE
|align="right"| 11,135 

|New Democratic Party
|Arnold PETERS 
|align="right"|10,661  

|Progressive Conservative
|Grant SIROLA
|align="right"|4,901

References

External links
 

1922 births
1996 deaths
Members of the House of Commons of Canada from Ontario
Co-operative Commonwealth Federation MPs
20th-century Canadian politicians
New Democratic Party MPs
People from Timiskaming District
Canadian trade unionists